Marquis Guy de Fayolle (8 July 1882 – 12 March 1944) was a French philatelist who was added to the Roll of Distinguished Philatelists in 1939. In 1913 he won a gold medal at the Exposition Philatelique Internationale in Paris for his display of the stamps of Greece. His collection of the classic stamps of Mexico was sold by Harmers in 1956.

Selected publications
Les premieres emissions du Mexique (1856 a 1874). 1935. (With Paul de Smeth)
Catalogue détaillé des timbres du Mexique. 1936.

References

Signatories to the Roll of Distinguished Philatelists
1882 births
1944 deaths
French philatelists
French nobility
Philately of Mexico